FWT may refer to:

 Fast Walsh–Hadamard transform, a mathematical algorithm
 Fast wavelet transform, a mathematical algorithm
 First Welfare Theorem, a theorem of welfare economics
 Fixed wireless terminal, another name for a wireless local loop
 The Formation World Tour, a concert tour by Beyoncé
 Freeride World Tour, an annual freeriding competition
 Freies Werkstatt Theater, in Cologne, Germany
 the station code for Waterloo railway station, Belgium